20 Puppis is a solitary star in the southern constellation of Puppis. It is visible to the naked eye as a faint, yellow-hued star with an apparent visual magnitude of 4.99. The star lies approximately 990 light years away from the Sun based on parallax. It is receding from the Earth with a heliocentric radial velocity of +16.8 km/s.

This object has a stellar classification of G4 Ib-II, matching a G-type star with a luminosity class part way between a bright giant and a supergiant star. It is just 90 million years old with around five times the mass of the Sun. The star has expanded to 48 times the Sun's radius and is radiating 1,087 times as much luminosity as the Sun from its enlarged photosphere at an effective temperature of 4,804 K.

References

G-type bright giants
G-type supergiants
Puppis
BD-15 2324
Puppis, 20
068752
040259
3229